Cayla Marie Barnes (born January 7, 1999) is an American ice hockey player with the Boston College Eagles and the American national team.

Career 
As a youth player, Barnes played with the Lady Ducks in California, before leaving home to attend a prep school in New Hampshire at the New Hampton School.

She will be one of three co-captains for the BC Eagles in the 2020–21 season, joining teammates Meagan Beres and Kelly Browne.

International  
She participated in the 2015, 2016, and 2017 IIHF Women's World U18 Championship, being named Best Defender of the tournament in both 2016 and 2017. She also participated in the 2017 U.S. Women's Residency Program.

Barnes would make her senior debut for the US at the age of 19 at the 2018 Winter Olympics, winning a gold medal as the youngest player on the team. She would then score six points in seven games for the US at the 2019 IIHF Women's World Championship, again winning gold and being named to the tournament all-star team.

On January 2, 2022, Barnes was named to Team USA's roster to represent the United States at the 2022 Winter Olympics.

Career Statistics

Awards and honors
2020-21 Second Team CCM/AHCA All-American
2020-21 All-USCHO.com Second Team

References

External links

Boston College Eagles bio

1999 births
Living people
American women's ice hockey defensemen
People from Eastvale, California
Boston College Eagles women's ice hockey players
Ice hockey players from California
Ice hockey players at the 2018 Winter Olympics
Ice hockey players at the 2022 Winter Olympics
Medalists at the 2018 Winter Olympics
Medalists at the 2022 Winter Olympics
Olympic gold medalists for the United States in ice hockey
Olympic silver medalists for the United States in ice hockey